Jamal Osman is a Somali-American politician in Minnesota's Democratic–Farmer–Labor Party. In August 2020, he was elected to the Minneapolis City Council to represent the city's 6th Ward.

Early life
Osman was born in Somalia and was a refugee in Kenya before coming to the United States when he was 14. After arriving in Minnesota, he lived in public housing.

Career
Osman is a social services worker and has worked as a resident advocate for the non-profit CommonBond Communities. He has also served on the board of the Phillips Community Clinic.

Minneapolis City Council
A special municipal election was held on August 11, 2020, for Ward 6's vacant seat. The previous councilmember, Abdi Warsame, resigned from the seat in March 2020 to head the Minneapolis Public Housing Authority. The special election occurred after the George Floyd protests and during the COVID-19 pandemic. Osman said he would address the opioid crisis and advocated for access to affordable housing. Osman defeated 10 other candidates in the race and was sworn into office on August 28, 2020.

Personal life
Osman is married to Ilo Amba, the founder of the non-profit organization Urban Advantage Services. The couple has five children. According to Osman, the family has resided in the Cedar Riverside neighborhood, but questions arose about Osman having had a Maplewood, Minnesota, residential address during his 2020 city council campaign.

Homophobic and antisemitic Facebook posts

In 2022, Osman apologized for homophobic and anti-Semitic Facebook posts he made between 2011 and 2013 after screenshots were unearthed of him allegedly commenting "Where's Hitler when you need him," in response to foreign policy discussion regarding Israel.

Electoral history

References

External links
Campaign website

American politicians of Somalian descent
1980s births
Living people
Somalian emigrants to the United States
Minneapolis City Council members
21st-century American politicians